When The Night Comes is an album by British producer Breakage. The album's main styles are dubstep, house, downtempo and drum & bass. It was released on 8 June 2015, on the Digital Soundboy label.

Critical reception
NME called the album "UK bass music at its best."

Track listing
"Vellocet" - 4:10
"Revelation" Featuring – Liam Bailey - 4:23
"Treading Water" Featuring – Detour City - 4:03
"Aquamission" - 0:48
"Stolen" Featuring – Lily Mckenzie - 4:11
"Own Worst Enemy" Featuring – Calyx - 4:33
"To Be Around You" - 4:09
"I On U" - 3:38
"Switchermission" - 1:17
"Future" Featuring – Madi Lane - 3:33
"Dedication" - 3:52
"Creepers" Featuring – Mercedes - 4:49
"Natty" - 3:52
"Bad Blood" Featuring – SLO - 5:04

References

External links
Breakage - When The Night Comes

2015 albums
Breakage (musician) albums